Bishop Teodosije (secular name Živko Šibalić, born 29 June 1963) is a Serbian Bishop of Raška-Prizren within Serbian Orthodox Church. He was born in Čačak, Central Serbia.

Biography 
After finishing theology in the Faculty of Theology of the University of Belgrade, he became a novice in Crna Reka Monastery. Fr. Teodosije became a priest in 1992 in Ćelije Monastery. He was elected the abbot of Visoki Dečani Monastery in March 1992, and in May 2004 he was ordained an auxiliary (titular) bishop of Lipljan. On November 18, 2010, Bishop Teodosije was elected as a new Bishop of Raška-Prizren by the Bishops' Council of the Serbian Orthodox Church.

See also
Eparchy of Raška and Prizren

References

External links

 Enthronement of Bishop of Raska and Prizren G. Theodosius (СПЦ, 27. December 2010)
 Enthroned of Bishop Teodosije („Политика“, 27. December 2010)
 Teodosije: Kosovo is my biggest school („Blic“, 27. December 2010)

Serbian theologians
Eastern Orthodox theologians
Bishops of Raška-Prizren
Living people
1963 births
People from Čačak
University of Belgrade Faculty of Orthodox Theology alumni